Steven Gaines (born 1946) is an American author, journalist, and radio show host. His 13 books include Philistines at the Hedgerow: Passion and Property in the Hamptons; The Sky’s the Limit: Passion and Property in Manhattan; The Love You Make: An Insider's Story of The Beatles; Heroes and Villains: The True Story of the Beach Boys; Marjoe, the biography of evangelist Marjoe Gortner; Fool's Paradise: Players, Poseurs and the Culture of Excess in South Beach; and One of These Things First, a memoir. His 1991 biography of the fashion designer Halston (Simply Halston) was the basis for Ryan Murphy's 2021 Netflix series, for which Ewan McGregor won the Best Actor Emmy Award.

Gaines was a contributing editor at New York Magazine and his journalism has appeared in Vanity Fair, the New York Observer, the New York Times, Los Angeles, Worth, and Connoisseur.

From 2003 to 2010 Gaines hosted a weekly, live roundtable radio interview show from the Hamptons called "Sunday Brunch Live from the American Hotel in Sag Harbor," that aired from Memorial Weekend to Labor Day on a local National Public Radio affiliate.

Life

Gaines was born and brought up in the Borough Park section of Brooklyn, New York and attended Erasmus Hall High School and New York University, where he studied with film director Martin Scorsese.  
His father was a school teacher and child guidance counselor, and his mother a bookkeeper. When he was 15 years old, after a suicide attempt because he was gay, he was voluntarily hospitalized at the Payne Whitney Psychiatric Clinic in Manhattan, which is the subject of his memoir, "One Of These Things First."

He graduated near the bottom of his class at Erasmus Hall, and flunked out of Temple University, in Philadelphia, Pennsylvania.  It was in Philadelphia that he met children's TV star Gene London who encouraged him to write.

Gaines was working in a small auction gallery in 1971 when he met former child evangelist Marjoe Gortner at Max's Kansas City, a New York restaurant and club.  Although Gaines had never published anything before he convinced Gortner to allow him to write his biography, which was published by Harper & Row (now HarperCollins) in 1973.
The movie of "Marjoe" won the 1972 Academy Award for Best Documentary, and although the film was not based on Gaines' biography, the attention brought by the Academy Award helped promote the book "Marjoe" into a religion bestseller and establish Gaines' career as a writer.

The same year Marjoe was published, Gaines became editor of Circus, a national teeny-bopper rock and roll magazine, and he also began a six-year run as the "Top of the Pop" columnist for the New York Sunday News, on alternate Sundays, dual positions that gave him a catbird seat in the fast lane of the rock and roll business during the golden era of the seventies.

Gaines spent a year on the road living with Alice Cooper, and in 1976 he published "Me, Alice," by Alice Cooper with Steven Gaines, the first autobiography of a rock star.  Published only in hardcover, the book has since become a collectors' item and sells for up to $2500 a copy.

In 1978 Gaines met Robert Jon Cohen, a 21-year-old Studio 54 bartender, with whom he collaborated on a book called The Club, a thinly-veiled roman a clef about Studio 54. The book raised the ire of nightclub owner Steve Rubell, designer Halston, and singer Liza Minnelli, among others.  Fodder for the gossip columns, the book caused a sensation and got advances in the six-figures, but won Gaines ignominy. Soon after the publication of The Club, Gaines moved to Laguna Beach, California, then to London, and finally to East Hampton, New York, where he wrote the international best-seller The Love You Make: An Insiders Story of the Beatles, with Beatle insider Peter Brown.  Published in 1983, The Love You Make was on the New York Times Hardcover bestseller list for 16 weeks.

Career
Gaines began his journalism career as the "Top of the Pop" columnist for the New York Daily News . In the early part of his career he wrote several books about the music business, including Alice Cooper's autobiography, "Me, Alice"; "The Love You Make," a biography of the Beatles; and "Heroes and Villains," a biography of the Beach Boys, before briefly switching his focus to fashion designers with biographies on Halston and Calvin Klein.

In 1978 he wrote the lyrics for two major disco hits, "New York at Night" and "Like An Eagle," composed by Village People creator Jaques Morali.

In 1980 he published a controversial "roman a clef" called The Club about the nightclub Studio 54 that he co-wrote with a 21-year-old Studio 54 bartender, Robert Jon Cohen.  As Robert Granit, he published Another Runner in the Night in 1981, a novel about a homosexual film producer married to the daughter of a studio boss. He coined the phrase "velvet mafia" in his "New York Sunday News" column in reference to the Robert Stigwood Organization, a British record company and management group, but the term soon began to be used to describe the influential gay crowd who ran Hollywood and the fashion industry.

Gaines is best known for his 1998 social and cultural history of the East End  of Long Island called Philistines at the Hedgerow: Passion and Property in the Hamptons.

In 1993 he co-founded the Hamptons International Film Festival.

In 1999 he created one of the first online magazines, iHamptons.com.

In 2021 his book, Simply Halston, The Untold Story, was made into a Netflix TV series starring Ewan McGregor, who won the Emmy Award for best actor for his portrayal of the fashion designer. The Netflix series was also nominated for a Writers Guild Award for best screenplay adapted from a book.

Books 

Marjoe, the biography of evangelist Marjoe Gortner;

Me, Alice, the autobiography of rock star Alice Cooper;

Discotheque, a novel;

The Club, a novel (with Robert Jon Cohen);

Another Runner in the Night, a novel;

The Love You Make: An Insider’s Story of the Beatles (with Peter Brown);

Heroes and Villains: The True Story of the Beach Boys.;

Simply Halston: The Untold Story;

Obsession: The Lives and Times of Calvin Klein (with Sharon Churcher)

Philistines at the Hedgerow: Passion and Property in the Hamptons.

The Sky’s the Limit: Passion and Property in Manhattan.

Fool's Paradise: Players, Poseurs and the Culture of Excess in South Beach.

One of These Things First, a memoir.

References
http://www.cnn.com/books/dialogue/9808/steven.gaines/

http://www.newnownext.com/halston-designer-tv-miniseries/03/2019/

https://www.vanityfair.com/hollywood/2021/05/halston-victor-hugo-real-life

hittp://https://awards.wga.org/awards/nominees-winners

https://patch.com/new-york/easthampton/author-steven-gaines-opens-new-book-hamptons-life

https://pagesix.com/2019/01/10/halston-biographer-pleased-book-will-get-miniseries-treatment/

https://www.advocate.com/books/2016/8/23/convincing-suicidal-teen-he-can-wish-gay-away

https://www.27east.com/arts/simply-halston-by-steven-gaines-soon-to-be-a-netflix-series-1685706/?highlight=Gaines

https://www.vanityfair.com/hollywood/2021/05/halston-studio-54-real-life

https://www.danspapers.com/2021/05/out-east-end-steven-gaines/

External links

Living people
1946 births
Writers from Brooklyn
People from Borough Park, Brooklyn
Erasmus Hall High School alumni
American male non-fiction writers
American music journalists
American non-fiction writers
American writers about music